In Greek mythology, the name Henioche (Ancient Greek: Ἡνιόχη, fem. of ἠνίοχος "charioteer") may refer to:

Henioche, surname of Hera in Lebadea.
Henioche or Eniocha, wife of King Creon of Thebes according to some authors, more commonly known as Eurydice. She was probably the mother of Menoeceus (Megareus), Lycomedes, Haemon, and Pyrrha.
Henioche, daughter of Creon by either the above Henioche or Eurydice. She was probably the sister of Menoeceus, Lycomedes, Haemon, and Pyrrha. Together with the latter, there were statues erected for them at the entrance of the sanctuary of Apollo Ismenius in Thebes.
Henioche, daughter of Pittheus, thus a sister of Aethra. She was the mother of the bandit Sciron or Sinis by Canethus.
Henioche, daughter of Armenius, the descendant of Admetus. She was the consort of Andropompus and mother by him of Melanthus, who in his turn was father of Codrus.
Henioche, old nurse of Medea.
Henioche or Heniocheia could be the correct form behind Henicea in Hyginus' catalogue of Priam's children.

Notes

References 

 Gaius Julius Hyginus, Fabulae from The Myths of Hyginus translated and edited by Mary Grant. University of Kansas Publications in Humanistic Studies. Online version at the Topos Text Project.
 Gaius Valerius Flaccus, Argonautica translated by Mozley, J H. Loeb Classical Library Volume 286. Cambridge, MA, Harvard University Press; London, William Heinemann Ltd. 1928. Online version at theio.com.
 Gaius Valerius Flaccus, Argonauticon. Otto Kramer. Leipzig. Teubner. 1913. Latin text available at the Perseus Digital Library.
 Hesiod, Shield of Heracles from The Homeric Hymns and Homerica with an English Translation by Hugh G. Evelyn-White, Cambridge, MA.,Harvard University Press; London, William Heinemann Ltd. 1914. Online version at the Perseus Digital Library. Greek text available from the same website.
 Pausanias, Description of Greece with an English Translation by W.H.S. Jones, Litt.D., and H.A. Ormerod, M.A., in 4 Volumes. Cambridge, MA, Harvard University Press; London, William Heinemann Ltd. 1918. Online version at the Perseus Digital Library
 Pausanias, Graeciae Descriptio. 3 vols. Leipzig, Teubner. 1903.  Greek text available at the Perseus Digital Library.
 Sophocles, The Antigone of Sophocles edited with introduction and notes by Sir Richard Jebb. Cambridge. Cambridge University Press. 1893. Online version at the Perseus Digital Library.
 Sophocles, Sophocles. Vol 1: Oedipus the king. Oedipus at Colonus. Antigone. With an English translation by F. Storr. The Loeb classical library, 20. Francis Storr. London; New York. William Heinemann Ltd.; The Macmillan Company. 1912. Greek text available at the Perseus Digital Library.

Princesses in Greek mythology
Queens in Greek mythology
Troezenian mythology
Epithets of Hera